This is a summary of 2008 in music in the United Kingdom.

Events
31 January – Laura Attwood of the King Edward VI School in Morpeth wins the second Eileen Bowler Award.
20 February – The 2008 BRIT Awards ceremony is hosted by Ozzy, Sharon, Kelly and Jack Osbourne, at Earls Court in London.
26 February – The Return of the Spice Girls tour comes to a close in Toronto.
28 February – The Shockwaves NME Awards 2008 ceremony is held at The O2 in London. Winners include The Enemy, The Killers, Klaxons, Manic Street Preachers and Radiohead.
1 March – The X Factor finalist Andy Abraham's song "Even If" wins the BBC's Eurovision: Your Decision 2008 show, and is thus chosen to represent the UK in the Eurovision Song Contest 2008 final in Belgrade, Serbia.
31 March – theJazz radio station stops broadcasting.
3 May – Girls Aloud begin their Tangled Up Tour in Belfast, UK.
8 May – The Classical BRIT Awards ceremony is hosted by Myleene Klass.
10–11 May – The Give It A Name 2008 festival is held at Earls Court, London, UK.
24 May – Andy Abraham represents the UK in the Eurovision Song Contest 2008 final in Belgrade, Serbia. The UK entry receives just fourteen points and comes joint last, raising questions over the United Kingdom's future in the contest.
3 July – Opening of the O2 Wireless Festival in Hyde Park, London, UK.
11–13 July – The 2008 T in the Park festival takes place at Balado, in Perth and Kinross, Scotland. Headlining acts included The Verve, Rage Against the Machine, R.E.M., and the Kaiser Chiefs.
25 September – Former Beatle Paul McCartney performs at Tel Aviv park, his first performance in Israel since The Beatles were banned from the country in 1965.
1 October – the Society for the Promotion of New Music merges with the British Music Information Centre (BMIC), the Contemporary Music Network and the Sonic Arts Network to create a new organisation to promote contemporary Music in the UK called Sound and Music.
1–9 November – The Southbank Centre in London presents "Klang: A Tribute to Stockhausen", a festival curated by Oliver Knussen, with a series of concerts focusing on works from the composer's last decade, including the world premieres of Urantia and Zodiac for Orchestra, as well as late-night performances, lectures, and master classes.
6 November – Michael Tilson Thomas makes his Philadelphia Orchestra subscription-concert conducting debut.
6 November - Aminah.H.A was born
23 November - Richey Edwards, original guitarist with Manic Street Preachers is officially declared "presumed dead", having been missing since February 1995.
9 December – Damon Albarn and Graham Coxon say that Blur will reunite for a concert at Hyde Park on 3 July 2009. Tickets for the concert sell out within two minutes of release, and Blur announce another date on 2 July 2009.
13 December – Alexandra Burke wins the fifth series of The X Factor. JLS are named runner-ups, while Eoghan Quigg and Diana Vickers finish in third and fourth place respectively.

UK Charts

Classical music
Peter Maxwell Davies – A Hymn to the Spirit of Fire
Karl Jenkins – Stabat Mater
Michael Nyman – Yamamoto Perpetuo for Solo Flute
John Tavener – Requiem
Graham Waterhouse – Bright Angel

Opera
Harrison Birtwistle - The Minotaur
Andy Vores - No Exit

Music awards

Brit Awards

British Male Solo Artist: Mark Ronson
British Female Solo Artist: Kate Nash
British Group: Arctic Monkeys
MasterCard British Album: Arctic Monkeys - Favourite Worst Nightmare
British Single: Take That - "Shine"
British Breakthrough Act: Mika
British Live Act: Take That
International Male Solo Artist: Kanye West
International Female Solo Artist: Kylie Minogue
International Group: Foo Fighters
International Album: Foo Fighters - Echoes, Silence, Patience & Grace
Critic's Choice: Adele
Outstanding Contribution to Music: Paul McCartney
Male of the Year — Sir Colin Davis
Female of the Year — Anna Netrebko
Young British Classical Performer — Nicola Benedetti
Album of the Year — Blake — Blake
Soundtrack of the Year — Blood Diamond — James Newton Howard
Critics' Award — Steven Isserlis — Bach: Cello Suites
Outstanding Contribution — Andrew Lloyd Webber

Popjustice £20 Music Prize
The 2008 Popjustice £20 Music Prize was awarded to Girls Aloud - "Call the Shots"

Record of the Year
Nickelback - "Rockstar"

British Composer Awards
Chamber - Joe Cutler
Choral - Michael Zev Gordon
Sonic Art - Janek Schaefer
Instrumental Solo or Duo - Judith Bingham
Orchestral - Luke Bedford
Stage Works - Jonathan Dove
Vocal - Howard Skempton

Ivor Novello Awards
Best Song Musically & Lyrically: Amy Winehouse - Love is a Losing Game
PRS Most Performed Work: Take That - "Shine"
Album: Radiohead - In Rainbows
Songwriter of the Year - Mika
International Achievement - Phil Collins

Deaths
30 January – Miles Kington, bassist, 66
28 February - Mike Smith, singer and producer (The Dave Clark Five), 64 (pneumonia) 
12 March – Alun Hoddinott, composer, 78
21 March - John Noble, baritone, 77
24 March – Neil Aspinall, music industry executive, 66 (lung cancer)
29 March – Allan Ganley, jazz drummer, 77
15 April - Brian Davison, drummer (The Nice), 65
24 April - Tristram Cary, composer, 82
25 April – Humphrey Lyttelton, jazz musician and radio presenter, 86
29 April – Micky Waller, drummer, 66
17 May – Wilfrid Mellers, musicologist and composer, 94
28 May – Danny Moss, jazz saxophonist, 80
30 May - Campbell Burnap, jazz trombonist and broadcaster, 68 (cancer) 
1 July - Mel Galley, guitarist (Whitesnake, Trapeze, Finders Keepers, and Phenomena), 60  
7 July – Hugh Mendl, record producer, 88
14 August – Lita Roza, singer, 82
7 September - Peter Glossop, opera singer, 80
10 September – Vernon Handley, conductor, 77
12 September - Marjorie Thomas, contralto, 85
15 September – Richard Wright, keyboardist (Pink Floyd), 65
10 October - Dave Wright (The Troggs), 64
11 October - Russ Hamilton, singer, 78
13 October – Gus Chambers, vocalist, 52
4 November - Alan Hazeldine, conductor and pianist, 60
12 November – Mitch Mitchell, drummer (The Jimi Hendrix Experience), 61
23 November 
Richard Hickox, conductor, 60 (dissecting thoracic aneurysm)
Richey Edwards, guitarist (Manic Street Preachers) (legally dead, disappeared in 1995 aged 27)
24 November - Michael Lee, drummer (The Cult), 39 (epileptic seizure)
15 December - Davey Graham, guitarist, 68

See also
2008 in British radio
2008 in British television
2008 in the United Kingdom
List of British films of 2008

References

 
British music
Music
British music by year